The China Youth Daily is the newspaper of the Communist Youth League of China since 1951 with editorial and financial independence in the People's Republic of China.

In the 1980s, it was regarded as the best newspaper in mainland China with a circulation of 5 million a day. Its present circulation is estimated to be nearly one million in 40 countries and regions.

Background
The China Youth Daily was established in 1951, six years before the Chinese Socialist Youth League decided to change its name to the Communist Youth League of China (CYL).

Freezing Point (冰点 pinyin: Bing diǎn), a four-page weekly supplement of China Youth Daily was temporarily shut down by the Chinese government in early 2006, due to an anti-censorship letter posted by columnist Li Datong. According to The Washington Post, government censors accused the section of "'viciously attacking the socialist system' and condemned a recent article in it that criticized the history textbooks used in Chinese middle schools." Pressure from retired high-level party officials and senior scholars forced the government to allow publication again, but without its former editor and top investigative reporter, according to The New York Times.

Readership
According to the Asia Leadership Fellow Program, "China Youth Daily (CYD) is one of the most influential newspapers in contemporary China with a circulation of 800,000 (readership, which is much more, is not officially recorded). A market research report by China Statistical Bureau ranks CYD in third place on the reading rate among the national daily papers."

The Chinese version of China Youth Daily Online was established in 2000.

See also

 List of newspapers in the People's Republic of China

References

External links

 

Newspapers published in Beijing
Chinese-language newspapers (Simplified Chinese)
Publications established in 1951
1951 establishments in China
Communist Youth League of China
Chinese Communist Party newspapers
Daily newspapers published in China